Austin Edwards (born August 27, 1997) is an American football defensive end for the Houston Roughnecks of the XFL. He was signed by the Atlanta Falcons as an undrafted free agent in 2020 following his college football career with the Ferris State Bulldogs, where he was 1st Team All-American and won the Gene Upshaw Award for Best D2 Defensive Lineman of The Year of 2019. He played in the 2019 East/West Shriners Game in St. Petersburg, FL where he drew the attention of the Kansas City Chiefs with several outstanding plays.

Professional career

Atlanta Falcons
Edwards signed with the Atlanta Falcons as an undrafted free agent following the 2020 NFL Draft on April 27, 2020. He was waived during final roster cuts on September 5, and signed to the team's practice squad the next day. He was released on September 25, and re-signed to the practice squad on September 29. He was elevated to the active roster on October 24 for the team's week 7 game against the Detroit Lions, and reverted to the practice squad after the game. He was placed on the practice squad/COVID-19 list by the team on December 22, 2020, and restored to the practice squad on January 6, 2021. His practice squad contract with the team expired after the season on January 11, 2021.

Kansas City Chiefs
On January 13, 2021, Edwards was signed to the Kansas City Chiefs' practice squad. On February 9, 2021, Edwards re-signed with the Chiefs. He was waived on August 31, 2021 and re-signed to the practice squad the next day. He signed a reserve/future contract with the Chiefs on February 2, 2022. He was released on August 16, 2022.

Houston Roughnecks 
On November 17, 2022, Edwards was drafted by the Houston Roughnecks of the XFL.

References

External links
Atlanta Falcons bio
Ferris State Bulldogs football bio

1997 births
Living people
Sportspeople from Lansing, Michigan
Players of American football from Michigan
American football defensive ends
Ferris State Bulldogs football players
Atlanta Falcons players
Kansas City Chiefs players
Houston Roughnecks players